This list is of the Cultural Properties of Japan located within the town of Nichinan in Tottori Prefecture.

Statistics
As of 18 March 2010, 14 Properties have been designated and a further 2 Properties registered.

† One Special Natural Monument (denoted with an asterisk, smaller text, and brackets) is included within the count of Natural Monuments.

Designated Cultural Properties

Registered Cultural Properties

See also
 Cultural Properties of Japan
 Hiba-Dōgo-Taishaku Quasi-National Park

References

External links
 Outline of the Cultural Administration of Japan
  Cultural Properties of Tottori Prefecture
  Cultural Properties of Nichinan

Nichinan, Tottori
Lists of Cultural Properties of Japan